The Sinatra Project is a 2008 studio album by the American singer Michael Feinstein, recorded in tribute to the singer Frank Sinatra (1915–1998).

Track listing

Personnel

Performance
 Michael Feinstein - vocal

Production
 John Burk - executive producer

References

2008 albums
Michael Feinstein albums
Concord Records albums
Frank Sinatra tribute albums